Paul Constantin Pepene (born 21 May 1988 in Brașov) is a Romanian cross-country skier. Pepene won the 30 km pursuit at the U-23 World Championships in January 2010, and competed in the 2009 World Ski Championships and at the 2010 Winter Olympics. At the 2010 Olympics, Pepene competed at three events, notably finishing 29th in the 30 km pursuit.

Cross-country skiing results
All results are sourced from the International Ski Federation (FIS).

Olympic Games

Distance reduced to 30 km due to weather conditions.

World Championships

World Cup

Season standings

References

External links
 
 
 

1988 births
Cross-country skiers at the 2010 Winter Olympics
Cross-country skiers at the 2014 Winter Olympics
Cross-country skiers at the 2018 Winter Olympics
Cross-country skiers at the 2022 Winter Olympics
Living people
Olympic cross-country skiers of Romania
Romanian male cross-country skiers
Tour de Ski skiers
Sportspeople from Brașov